Bare Knees is a 1928 American silent film comedy drama directed by Erle C. Kenton and starring Virginia Lee Corbin as Billie Durey, the family's black sheep, who returns to her small hometown causing a sensation with her short skirts, cigarettes and other "flapper" accoutrements.

An extant film, it is available on DVD (along with the 1928 Hairbreadth Harry comedy "Danger Ahead") from Grapevine Video, transferred from the only known 35mm nitrate print.

Cast
Virginia Lee Corbin as Billie Durey
Donald Keith as Larry Cook
Jane Winton as Jane Longworth
Johnnie Walker a Paul Gladden
Forrest Stanley as John Longworth
Maude Fulton as Bessie

References

External links
Bare Knees at IMDb.com
allmovie/synopsis; Bare Knees
Bare Knees, Moviessilently.com
Restored lobby poster

1928 films
American silent feature films
Films directed by Erle C. Kenton
1928 comedy-drama films
1920s English-language films
American black-and-white films
Films produced by Samuel Sax
Gotham Pictures films
Flappers
1920s American films
Silent American comedy-drama films